The Simon Bamberger Home, also known as Gardner Manor, is a house in Salt Lake City, Utah, United States, that was built in the 1880s. Its architectural style has been described as a transitional "Pre-Victorian, neo-Greek Revival" type, having obvious characteristics of grandeur and power.  It has pilasters, window bays, and a classical Greek entablature.  The house is significant primarily for its association with Simon Bamberger, an immigrant who was elected as the fourth governor of Utah in 1916.  Bamberger was the first owner of the home.

The house was listed on the National Register of Historic Places in 1975.

See also

 National Register of Historic Places listings in Salt Lake City

References

External links

Houses completed in 1881
Houses in Salt Lake City
Houses on the National Register of Historic Places in Utah
1880s establishments in Utah Territory
National Register of Historic Places in Salt Lake City
1881 establishments in Utah Territory